City High is the only studio album by contemporary R&B trio City High. It was released on May 22, 2001.

Background
The group began as Robbie Pardlo signing as a solo artist. However, producers decided the album should feature a two-man group, and Pardlo's high school friend Ryan Toby soon joined. The two-man group began work on an album. In an effort to stand out from similar duo acts, like The Product G&B, producers decided to add a female member. They chose Claudette Ortiz, a schoolmate from Pardlo and Toby's high school.

During production, all three members participated in writing songs for the album, though Toby did most of the writing, and Pardlo did most of the production, given that Ortiz was just 16 years old. The trio focused on lyrics that told a story, Toby noting inspiration from country music. Much of the album's lyrical content is based on the trio's real-life experiences, such as the song "What Would You Do?" and the story it tells.

"What Would You Do?" was featured on the soundtrack to the March 1999 film Life; however, the track was not formally released as a single until March 2001. This helped with the sale of the City High album, and the May 2001 released album became a hit, achieving Gold status within four months.  2002 saw a reissue of the album with a different track list order.

Singles
"What Would You Do?" was the lead single from the album. It peaked at No. 8 on the US Billboard Hot 100, No. 1 on Hot Rap Singles, No. 13 on Hot R&B/Hip-Hop Singles & Tracks, and No. 3 on the UK Singles Chart. To date, the song remains the group's most successful single and is the one that made the album popular.

"Caramel" was the album's second single. Though not as successful as their first, it still managed to peak at No. 9 on the Hot R&B/Hip-Hop Singles & Tracks and No. 18 on the Billboard Hot 100.

"City High Anthem" was the album's third single; however, it was unsuccessful and did not chart.

Reception

The album received generally favorable reviews. AllMusic's Jon Azpiri noted "it stands as an impressive debut". Jon Caramanica of Rolling Stone said that, although "today's bling-tastic R&B usually avoids social commentary", City High's debut "hinges on thick, stomp-worthy funk, luxurious soul grooves and plaintive harmonies about messy modern love". RTE Entertainment's John Raftery raved that "'City High' seem to be part of a movement, alongside Lucy Pearl and Spooks, which is letting the world know that black America is about more than just blunts and guns. That alone makes this classy album stand out from the crowd." Q magazine said that "few have managed to capture the original Fugee spirit like City High". In a mixed review, Maurice Bottomley of PopMatters felt that some songs have poor lyrical content, including "City High Anthem"'s "collection of clichés beyond any chance of redemption", and said that "15 Will Get You 20" is "catchy to the point of irritation".

City High's debut album did excellently on the charts debuting at #34 on the Billboard 200 and was certified Gold by the RIAA months later. The first single "What Would You Do?" reached number 8 on the Billboard Hot 100. The single was nominated for a Grammy Award for Best R&B Performance By A Duo or Group.

Track listing

Original version (2001)

Re-release (2002)

Bonus track edition

UK bonus track edition

Personnel
Kwaku Alston – photography
Gerard Avant – producer
Ron Banks – mixing
Vidal Davis – producer, engineer
Jerry Duplessis – producer, executive producer, mixing
Jason Dyer – mixing assistant
Serban Ghenea – mixing
Andy Grassi – engineer, mixing
Andre Harris – producer
Wyclef Jean – producer, executive producer, mixing
Carlton Jones – stylist
Clark Kent – producer, mixing
Sonny Kompanek – string arrangements
Alex Ndione – mixing
Robbie Pardlo – producer, engineer, executive producer, mixing, vocals
Salaam Remi – producer, engineer, vocal arrangement, mixing, vocal producer
Ryan Toby – producer, engineer, executive producer, vocal arrangement, mixing, vocal producer, vocals
Joe Yannece – mastering
Claudette Ortiz – producer, vocals
Cus – mixing

Charts

Weekly charts

Year-end charts

Certifications

References

2001 debut albums
City High albums
Interscope Records albums
Albums produced by Clark Kent (producer)
Albums produced by Jerry Duplessis
Albums produced by Ryan Toby
Albums produced by Salaam Remi
Albums produced by Wyclef Jean